Theodore Chaikin Sorensen (May 8, 1928 – October 31, 2010) was an American lawyer, writer, and presidential adviser. He was a speechwriter for President John F. Kennedy, as well as one of his closest advisers. President Kennedy once called him his "intellectual blood bank". Notably, though it was a collaborative effort with Kennedy, Sorensen was generally regarded as the author of the majority of the final text of Profiles in Courage, and stated in his memoir that he helped write the book. Profiles in Courage won Kennedy the 1957 Pulitzer Prize for Biography. Sorensen helped draft Kennedy's inaugural address and was also the primary author of Kennedy's 1962 "We choose to go to the Moon" speech.

Early life
Sorensen was born in Lincoln, Nebraska, the son of Christian A. Sorensen (1890–1959), who served as Nebraska attorney general (1929–1933), and Annis (Chaikin) Sorensen. His father was Danish American and his mother was of Russian Jewish descent. His younger brother, Philip C. Sorensen, later became the lieutenant governor of Nebraska. He graduated from Lincoln High School during 1945. He earned a bachelor's degree at the University of Nebraska, Lincoln, and attended University of Nebraska College of Law, graduating first in his class.

During January 1953, the 24-year-old Sorensen became the new Senator John F. Kennedy's chief legislative aide. He wrote many of Kennedy's articles and speeches. In his 2008 autobiography Counselor: A Life at the Edge of History, Sorensen said he wrote "a first draft of most of the chapters" of John F. Kennedy's 1956 book Profiles in Courage and "helped choose the words of many of its sentences."

Kennedy administration
 

Sorensen was President Kennedy's special counsel, adviser, and primary speechwriter, the role for which he is remembered best. He helped draft the inaugural address in which Kennedy said famously, "Ask not what your country can do for you; ask what you can do for your country." Although Sorensen played an important part in the composition of the inaugural address, he has stated that "the speech and its famous turn of phrase that everyone remembers was written by Kennedy himself." In his 2008 memoir, Counselor: A Life at the Edge of History, Sorensen claimed, "The truth is that I simply don't remember where the line came from."

During the early months of the administration, Sorensen's responsibilities concerned the domestic agenda. After the Bay of Pigs debacle, Kennedy asked Sorensen to participate with foreign policy discussions as well. During the Cuban Missile Crisis, Sorensen served as a member of ExComm and was named by Secretary of Defense Robert S. McNamara as one of the "true inner circle" members who advised the president, the others being Attorney General Robert F. Kennedy, National Security Adviser McGeorge Bundy, Secretary of State Dean Rusk, General Maxwell D. Taylor (chairman of the Joint Chiefs), former ambassador to the USSR Llewellyn Thompson, and McNamara himself. Sorensen played a critical role in drafting Kennedy's correspondence with Nikita Khrushchev and worked on Kennedy's first address to the nation about the crisis on October 22.

Sorensen was devastated by Kennedy's assassination, which he termed "the most deeply traumatic experience of my life. ... I had never considered a future without him." He later quoted a poem that he said summed up how he felt: "How could you leave us, how could you die? We are sheep without a shepherd when the snow shuts out the sky." He submitted a letter of resignation to President Lyndon B. Johnson the day after the assassination but was persuaded to stay through the transition. Sorensen drafted Johnson's first address to Congress as well as the 1964 State of the Union. He officially resigned February 29, 1964, and was the first member of the Kennedy Administration to do so. As Johnson was later to recount in his memoirs, Sorensen helped in the transition to the new administration with those speeches.

Prior to his resignation, Sorensen stated his intent to write Kennedy's biography, calling it "the book that President Kennedy had intended to write with my help after his second term." He was not the only Kennedy aide to publish writings; Paul “Red” Fay, Jr., Kennedy’s Secretary of the Navy and a close friend of Kennedy’s from his Navy service wrote The Pleasure of His Company, David Powers and Kenneth O’Donnell, Special Assistants to the President wrote Johnny, We Hardly Knew Ye, and historian and special assistant Arthur M. Schlesinger Jr. wrote his Pulitzer Prize winning memoir A Thousand Days: John F. Kennedy in the White House during the same period. Sorensen's biography, Kennedy, was published during 1965 and became an international bestseller.

Politics after Kennedy
Sorensen later joined the U.S. law firm of Paul, Weiss, Rifkind, Wharton & Garrison LLP, where he was of counsel, while still staying involved in politics. He was involved with Democratic campaigns and was a major adviser of Robert F. Kennedy in Kennedy's 1968 presidential campaign. After the death of Robert Kennedy he wrote a book entitled The Kennedy Legacy: A Peaceful Revolution For The Seventies (1969) about the political ideals of the Kennedy brothers that could be applied to the Democratic Party in particular and to America and American society in general going forward. During the next four decades, Sorensen had a career as an international lawyer, advising governments around the world, as well as major international corporations.

During the 1970 United States Senate election in New York, Sorensen was the Democratic party's designee for the Democratic nomination for U.S. senator from New York. He was challenged in the primary election by Richard Ottinger, Paul O'Dwyer, and Max McCarthy, and polled third. The winning nominee Ottinger was subsequently defeated by James L. Buckley in the general election. 

In 1973, Sorensen wrote a contingency plan for the presidential transition of the Democratic Speaker of the House Carl Albert. Albert was third in the United States presidential line of succession under the Twenty-fifth Amendment in the event that Richard Nixon was impeached or forced to resign by the Watergate scandal, and if the nomination of Gerald Ford to replace Spiro Agnew as Vice President failed. The memorandum included advice on drafting an inaugural address and appointing a Cabinet. It recommended the appointment of a Republican Vice President, but urged Albert to remain in office as President until the end of the term. The memorandum was discarded because Ford was nominated and because Albert personally did not wish to be President. 

During 1977, Jimmy Carter nominated Sorensen as Director of Central Intelligence (CIA), but the nomination was withdrawn before a Senate vote. Sorensen's help with explaining Ted Kennedy's Chappaquiddick incident and Sorensen's mishandling of classified information were cited as factors of Senate opposition to his nomination as CIA director. Sorensen in his autobiography attributed the loss of Senate approval for his nomination for CIA director to his conscientious objector status as a youth, his two failed marriages, and his writing an affidavit in defense of releasing Daniel Ellsberg's Pentagon Papers.

Sorensen was the national co-chairman for Gary Hart for the 1984 Democratic Party presidential primaries and made several appearances on his behalf.

In addition to his successful career as a lawyer, Sorensen was also a frequent spokesman for liberal ideals and ideas, writing opinion-editorials and delivering speeches concerning domestic and international subjects. For several years during the 1960s, he was an editor of the Saturday Review.

He was affiliated with a number of institutions, including the Council On Foreign Relations, The Century Foundation, Princeton University, and the Institute of Politics at the Harvard Kennedy School. Sorensen was a board member of the International Center for Transitional Justice and an advisory board member of the Partnership for a Secure America, a not-for-profit organization dedicated to recreating bipartisan consensus for American national security and foreign policy. He also was chairman of the advisory board to the International Center for Ethics, Justice and Public Life at Brandeis University. Sorensen also attended meetings of the Judson Welliver Society, a bipartisan social club composed of former presidential speechwriters.

During 2007, a model Democratic presidential nomination acceptance speech written by Sorensen was published in the Washington Monthly. The magazine had solicited him to write the speech that he would most want the 2008 Democratic nominee to give at the 2008 Democratic National Convention, without regard to the identity of the nominee.

On March 9, 2007, he spoke at an event with then-senator Barack Obama at New York City's Grand Hyatt Hotel and officially endorsed him for the presidential election in 2008. Very active in his campaign, Sorensen spoke early on and frequently about the similarities between Senator Barack Obama's and Senator John F. Kennedy's presidential campaigns. He also provided some assistance with President Obama's 2009 Inaugural Address.

Sorensen served on the advisory board of the National Security Network.

In his book Let The Word Go Forth, Sorensen's selects from more than 110 speeches and writings that indicate the importance of historical insights in Kennedy's thoughts and actions.

Personal life
He was married three times. His first marriage, in 1949, was to Camilla Palmer. The couple had three sons: Eric, Steven, and Philip. They later divorced.  In 1964, he married Sara Elbery. That marriage also ended in divorce. In 1969, Sorensen married Gillian Martin of the United Nations Foundation. They had a daughter, Juliet Sorensen, and remained married until Sorensen's death.

On February 25, 2010, he received the National Humanities Medal for 2009 in a ceremony in the East Room of the White House. He was awarded the medal for "Advancing our understanding of modern American politics. As a speechwriter and adviser to President Kennedy, he helped craft messages and policies, and later gave us a window into the people and events that made history."

Death
On October 31, 2010, Sorensen died at NewYork-Presbyterian Hospital in New York City of complications from a stroke he suffered the previous week.

Publications

Portrayals in media
Sorensen has been portrayed as a character in the following films and miniseries:
 The 1974 TV film The Missiles of October, by Clifford David
 The 1998 HBO mini-series From the Earth to the Moon, by Jack Gilpin
 The 2000 film Thirteen Days, by Tim Kelleher; although, in an interview after the film's release, Robert McNamara stated that the lead role of Kenneth O'Donnell (played by Kevin Costner) was modeled after Sorensen: "It was not Kenny O'Donnell who pulled us all together—it was Ted Sorensen."
 The 2016 film LBJ, by Brent Bailey
 The 2018 film Chappaquiddick, by Taylor Nichols

See also

 "Ich bin ein Berliner"
 American University speech
 Profiles in Courage (1964 TV series)

References

Further reading
 ABC News online, 2008-02-08. Passing the Torch: Kennedy's Touch on Obama's Words
 Clarke, Thurston. 2005. Ask Not: The Inauguration of John F. Kennedy and the Speech That Changed America. Macmillan, 304 pp. (Originally published 2004 by Henry Holt and Co., 272 pp.)
 Marcus, Jacob Rader. 1981. The American Jewish Woman, 1654–1980. KTAV Publishing House. 231 pp
 The New York Times, 1983-04-21.  New York Day by Day; Gary Hart Opens Campaign Headquarters
 The New York Times, Sunday Book Review, 18 May 2008, review of Ted Sorensen's Counselor.
 Sorensen, Ted (as Theodore C.) The New Vision. Washington Monthly, July/August 2007.
 Sorensen, Ted. 2008-07-23. Heir Time: Is Barack Obama The Next JFK? The New Republic
 Sorensen, Ted (as Theodore). 2007-07-25. Barack Obama: the new JFK. Guardian (London, UK)
 .
 Wall Street Journal, 9 May 2008, p. W3, review of Ted Sorensen's Counselor.

External links

 John F. Kennedy Library and Museum: Inventory of personal papers
 As a ghostwriter for Kennedy
 Lincoln High School Distinguished Alumni Profile
 Sorensen's Acceptance Address Prepared for the 2008 Democratic Presidential Nominee
 Sorensen speaks at MIT Symposium
 An February 2009 interview by Thorsten Overgaard with Ted Sorensen in Stockholm on Obama and Kennedy
 

1928 births
2010 deaths
20th-century American non-fiction writers
21st-century American non-fiction writers
American people of Danish descent
American political writers
American male non-fiction writers
Speechwriters for presidents of the United States
American people of Russian-Jewish descent
Kennedy administration personnel
Lawyers from New York City
Lyndon B. Johnson administration personnel
Members of the Universalist Church of America
National Humanities Medal recipients
Nebraska lawyers
Nebraska Democrats
New York (state) Democrats
People from Ridgefield, Connecticut
United States presidential advisors
University of Nebraska College of Law alumni
White House Counsels
Writers from Lincoln, Nebraska
Writers from New York City
Writers from Washington, D.C.
Paul, Weiss, Rifkind, Wharton & Garrison people
The Century Foundation
20th-century American male writers
21st-century American male writers